Ferintosh is the name of more than one place, including:

 Ferintosh, Alberta in Canada
 Ferintosh, Black Isle in Scotland